The 2017 Russian Figure Skating Championships were held from 20 to 26 December 2016 in Chelyabinsk, Chelyabinsk Oblast. Medals were awarded in the disciplines of men's singles, ladies' singles, pair skating, and ice dancing. The results were among the criteria used to select Russia's teams to the 2017 World Championships and 2017 European Championships.

Competitions
In the 2016–17 season, Russian skaters will compete in domestic qualifying events and national championships for various age levels. The Russian Cup series will lead to three events – the Russian Championships, the Russian Junior Championships, and the Russian Cup Final.

Medalists of most important competitions

Senior Championships
The senior Championships will be held in Chelyabinsk from 20 to 26 December 2016. Competitors will qualify through international success or by competing in the Russian Cup series' senior-level events.

Entries
The Russian figure skating federation published the full list of entries on 13 December 2016.

Results

Men
Mikhail Kolyada won his first national title by a margin of 23 points over the silver medalist, Alexander Samarin. Moving up from 7th after the short program, former champion Maxim Kovtun took the bronze medal.

Ladies
Medvedeva successfully defended her national title, outscoring Alina Zagitova by twelve points.

Pairs
Returning to competition following an injury, Stolbova / Klimov won their third national title by a margin of less than a point over Tarasova / Morozov.

Ice dancing
Bobrova / Soloviev obtained their sixth national title. Stepanova / Bukin took the silver medal, with a deficit of 7.72 points, while Sinitsina/Katsalapov edged out Ilinykh / Zhiganshin by 0.17 for the bronze.

Junior Championships
The 2017 Russian Junior Championships will be held in Saint Petersburg from 1 to 5 February 2017. Competitors will qualify by competing in the Russian Cup series' junior-level events. The results of the Junior Championships are part of the selection criteria for the 2017 World Junior Championships.

Entries
The Russian figure skating federation published the full list of entries on 16 January 2017.

Results

Men

Ladies

Pairs

Ice dancing

International team selections

European Championships
Russia's team to the 2017 European Championships was published on 25 December 2016.

Winter Universiade
Russia's team to the 2017 Winter Universiade was published on 25 December 2016.

Because the pairs' event had only two Russian entries, the pairs' event was cancelled.

European Youth Olympic Winter Festival
Russia's team to the 2017 European Youth Olympic Winter Festival was published on 2 February 2017.

World Junior Championships
Russia's team to the 2017 World Junior Championships was published on 5 February 2017.

World Championships
Russia's team to the 2017 World Championships.

World Team Trophy
Russia's team to the 2017 World Team Trophy.

References

External links
 
 2017 Russian Championships at the Figure Skating Federation of Russia

Russian Figure Skating Championships
Russian Championships
Russian Championships
Figure Skating Championships
Figure Skating Championships
February 2017 sports events in Russia